Arthur Sam Thomas (July 15, 1935 – January 19, 2001) was a Roman Catholic priest and the Chief of Chaplains of the United States Air Force from 1995 to 1997.

Biography
A native of Mankato, Minnesota, Thomas was a Roman Catholic priest. He was a graduate of Minnesota State University, Mankato and the Graduate Theological Union. In 1992, he was given the title of Monsignor by Pope John Paul II.

Career
Thomas originally joined the Minnesota National Guard in 1953 before joining the United States Air Force in 1955. His early years were spent as a Russian language specialist.

In 1982, he was named Senior Catholic Chaplain of the 86th Tactical Airlift Wing. He held that position until 1984, when he was assigned to Headquarters Tactical Air Command. From there, he was Command Chaplain of Air Force Logistics Command and Strategic Air Command before becoming Deputy Chief of Chaplains of the United States Air Force in 1991. He was promoted to Chief of Chaplains with the rank of major general in 1995 and held the position until his retirement in 1997. Msgr. Thomas died suddenly of a heart attack on Friday, January 19, 2001, in Florida, aged 65. He is buried at Arlington National Cemetery in Section 2 Site E-287 RH.

Awards and military decorations

References

People from Mankato, Minnesota
United States Air Force generals
United States Army soldiers
Chiefs of Chaplains of the United States Air Force
Recipients of the Legion of Merit
Minnesota State University, Mankato alumni
Graduate Theological Union alumni
2001 deaths
1935 births
Catholics from Minnesota
20th-century American Roman Catholic priests
Burials at Arlington National Cemetery
Military personnel from Minnesota